Salamat Hashim, also known as Hashim Salamat, was a Filipino militant who served as leader of the Moro Islamic Liberation Front. He is the founder of the group.

Early life and education
Hashim was born in Midsayap, Cotabato (now Pagalungan, Maguindanao) on July 7, 1939 to a religious family, one of seven siblings. At age six, he was taught by his mother on how to read the Quran. In the 1950s, Hashim received formal elementary and high school education and was an honor student.

In the 1958, Hashim joined the Hajj and decided to stay in Mecca to be mentored by Sheikh Zawawi. He was a regular attendee of the halaqat at the Masjid al Haram. He also underwent studies at the Madrasat as-Sulatiyah ad-Diniyah.

The following year, Hashim moved to Cairo to pursue further studies. He enrolled at the Al-Azhar University where he accomplished a bachelor's degree in theology, majoring in Aqeedah and Philosophy in 1967 and a post-graduate masters degree in the same university in 1969. He also pursued a doctorate degree but was not able to finish writing a dissertation due to his decision to return to the Philippines to organize a Moro revolutionary movement.

Militant career
 
Hashim along with other militants including Nur Misuari founded the Moro National Liberation Front (MNLF) in the 1970s. Hashim later left the group in the later part of the decade to form the Moro Islamic Liberation Front (MILF).

Death
Hashim died on July 13, 2003 while in one of the MILF's camps in Butig, Lanao del Sur, due to complications caused by a heart disease and acute ulcer. The MILF only publicly confirmed their leader's death days later on August 5. Murad Ebrahim succeeded Hashim as leader of the MILF.

Books
 The Bangsamoro Mujahid : his objectives and responsibilities, 1985.
 The Bangsamoro people's struggle against oppression and colonialism, 2001.
 Referendum : peaceful, civilized, democratic, and diplomatic means of solving the Mindanao conflict, 2002.

References

Filipino Muslims
2003 deaths
Filipino Islamists
Filipino activists
Al-Azhar University alumni
People from Maguindanao
1942 births
Filipino expatriates in Egypt
Filipino expatriates in Saudi Arabia
Moro Islamic Liberation Front members